A cervical mucus plug (operculum) is a plug that fills and seals the cervical canal during pregnancy. It is formed by a small amount of cervical mucus.

The mucus plug acts as a protective barrier by deterring the passage of bacteria into the uterus, and contains a variety of antimicrobial agents, including immunoglobulins, and similar antimicrobial peptides to those found in nasal mucus.

Normally during pregnancy, the mucus can be described as cloudy, clear, thick, salty and sticky, although viscoelasticity may be the most appropriate term to describe it. Toward the end of the pregnancy, when the cervix thins, some blood is released into the cervix which causes the mucus to become bloody. As the pregnant woman gets closer to labor, the mucus plug discharges as the cervix begins to dilate. The plug may come out as a plug, a lump, or simply as increased vaginal discharge over several days. The mucus may be tinged with brown, pink, or red blood, which is why the event is sometimes referred to as "bloody show". Loss of the mucus plug does not necessarily mean that delivery or labor is imminent.

Having intercourse or a vaginal examination can also disturb the mucus plug and cause a pregnant woman to see some blood-tinged discharge, even when labor does not begin over the next few days.

References

Obstetrics
Midwifery